Hygerta Sako is an Albanian sports journalist at RTSH and former model who won Miss Albania in 1995 and represented Albania at Miss Europe 1996 where she placed among the semifinalists.

References

Living people
Albanian female models
Albanian showgirls
20th-century Albanian models
People from Durrës
Year of birth missing (living people)